The 2022 Bridgend County Borough Council election took place on 5 May 2022 as part of the 2022 Welsh local elections. Fifty one councillors were elected to Bridgend County Borough Council.

Welsh Labour gained the council from no overall control.

Ward boundary changes
A local government boundary review of electoral wards took place prior to the election, by the Local Democracy and Boundary Commission for Wales. The recommendations were accepted by the Welsh Government in July 2021. For Bridgend County Borough, the number of wards were to be reduced, from 39 to 28. The number of councillors was to drop from 54 to 51. These changes were to take effect from the 2022 council election.

Results 
Labour regained a majority of seats at this election and therefore regained control of the council. The independents also gained seats, while the Conservatives lost 10 of their 11 seats.

Ward results

Aberkenfig

Blackmill

Brackla East and Coychurch Lower

 
 
 
 
 

After several recounts the second and third placed candidates were still tied on 460 votes each. The second place was decided by a blind vote, with the Returning Officer picking one of two envelopes containing the two names.

Brackla East Central

Brackla West Central

Brackla West

Bridgend Central

 
 
 
 
 
 

 

Note: Stuart Baldwin resigned shortly after being elected and a by-election was held on 11 August 2022.

Bryntirion, Laleston and Merthyr Mawr

Caerau

Cefn Glas

Coity Higher

Cornelly

Garw Valley

Llangynwyd

Maesteg East

Maesteg West

Nant-y-moel

Newton

Nottage

Ogmore Vale

Oldcastle

Pencoed and Penprysg

Pen-y-fai

Porthcawl East Central

Porthcawl West Central

Pyle, Kenfig Hill and Cefn Cribwr

Rest Bay

St. Bride's Minor and Ynysawdre

By-elections 2022-2027

Bridgend Central
Held on 11 August 2022 following the resignation of Stuart Baldwin (Labour)

References 

Bridgend County Borough Council elections
2022 Welsh local elections